Phanephos is an organophosphorus compound with the chemical formula (C2H4)2(C6H3PPh2)2 (Ph = C6H5). It is a white solid that is soluble in organic solvents.  It is an example of a chiral C2-symmetric diphosphine ligand used in asymmetric hydrogenation.  Many substituents have been introduced in place of the phenyl groups, e.g., i-Pr, C6H11, etc and a variety of chiral diphosphine ligands have been reported in asymmetric catalysis since the 1960s.

Preparation
Phanephos can be prepared in two steps from [2.2]paracyclophane. In the first step, [2.2]paracyclophane is dibrominated to give a pseudo-para dibromide. Thermal isomerisation then gives pseudo-ortho atropisomer of the dibromide. This isomer is subjected to lithium-halogen exchange by nBuLi and the resulting dilithium compound is treated with PPh2Cl to give a racemic mixture of Phanephos.

Uses

Phanephos has been used in rhodium- and ruthenium- mediated stereoselective hydrogenation of dehydro amino acid methyl esters and asymmetric reduction of various β-ketoesters with about 90 % ee.

References

Chelating agents
Diphosphines
Phenyl compounds
Cyclophanes